The 2017 Famous Idaho Potato Bowl was a college football bowl game played on Friday, December 22, 2017, at Albertsons Stadium in Boise, Idaho. The 21st annual Famous Idaho Potato Bowl, it was one of the 2017–18 bowl games concluding the 2017 FBS football season. The game was sponsored by the Idaho Potato Commission.

The game featured the Wyoming Cowboys (7–5) of the Mountain West Conference and the Central Michigan Chippewas (8–4) of the Mid-American Conference. The teams had played twice before; in 2000 (Wyoming won, 20–10), and in 2002 (Central Michigan won, 32–20).

The Cowboys led by twenty points at the half and defeated the Chippewas,

Central Michigan Chippewas

Central Michigan finished their regular season with an 8–4 record overall (6–2 in conference). This was their first Famous Idaho Potato Bowl.

Wyoming Cowboys

Wyoming finished their regular season with a 7–5 record overall (5–3 in conference). This was their first Famous Idaho Potato Bowl.

Scoring summary

Statistics

References

Famous Idaho Potato Bowl
Famous Idaho Potato Bowl
2017 Famous Idaho Potato Bowl
2017 Famous Idaho Potato Bowl
Famous Idaho Potato Bowl
December 2017 sports events in the United States